Častá is a village and municipality in western Slovakia in  Pezinok District in the Bratislava Region, on the foothills of the Little Carpathians. The village is best known for the Červený Kameň Castle, which is above the village.

History
The village was first mentioned in 1296, when it was established as a settlement under the Červený Kameň Castle. From 1944 to 1953, Častá had the village of Píla as its part.

Geography
The village lies at an altitude of 245 meters and covers an area of 35.24 km². It has population of 2,078 people.

Events
Hiking: "Častá's Fifty" (Častovská pädesiatka). Every year on 8 May a day hike takes place crossing the Little Carpathians to Záhorie and back usually starting at the gas station in Častá (6:00-9:30am) finishing on Častá's football field restaurant. You can choose 50-, 35-, 25-, or 12-km trails.

Famous people
Juraj Fándly, writer

See also
 List of municipalities and towns in Slovakia

References

Genealogical resources

The records for genealogical research are available at the state archive "Statny Archiv in Bratislava, Slovakia"

 Roman Catholic church records (births/marriages/deaths): 1639-1896 (parish A)

External links 

  Municipal website 
Surnames of living people in Casta

Villages and municipalities in Pezinok District
Hutterite communities in Europe
Hungarian German communities